The Deep Purple is a lost 1915 film directed by James Young from a play written by Paul Armstrong and Wilson Mizner.  The film stars Clara Kimball Young and Milton Sills, and was remade in 1920 again titled The Deep Purple by director Raoul Walsh.

The film is based on a 1910 play, produced on Broadway in 1911 starring Catherine Calvert.

This is the first film of actress Esther Ralston, then 13 years old, who has a bit role.

Cast
Clara Kimball Young - Doris Moore
Edward Kimball - Rev. William Moore
Milton Sills - William Lake
Mae Hopkins - Ruth Lake
Mrs. E.M. Kimball - Mrs. Lake
William J. Ferguson - 'Pop' Clark
Grace Aylesworth - 'Fresno' Kate Fallon
Crauford Kent - Harry Leland
Frederick Truesdell - Inspector Bruce
DeWitt Jennings - Gordon Laylock
Walter Craven - Pat Connelly

unbilled cast
Esther Ralston - Bit, Angel
Bert Starkey - Bit

References

External links
 
 

1915 films
Films directed by James Young
American films based on plays
American silent feature films
1915 drama films
Silent American drama films
American black-and-white films
World Film Company films
Lost American films
1915 lost films
Lost drama films
1910s American films
1910s English-language films